Afcons Infrastructure Limited is a construction and engineering company based in Mumbai, Maharashtra, India. The company provides infrastructure services and is involved in the construction of infrastructure projects such as viaducts, flyovers, metros, bridges, pipelines, roads, ports, barrages, oil and gas projects etc.

Afcons is a subsidiary of the Indian business conglomerate Shapoorji Pallonji Group who acquired the company in 2000. In 2006, there was widespread speculation that Afcons would go public in an IPO but the company did not go through with it.

Projects

 Namma Metro, metro transport in Bangalore.
 Chenab Railway Bridge
 Atal Tunnel
 Dhaka-Chittagong railway corridor doubling
 Chennai Metro blue line
 Kanpur Metro
 Kolkata Metro Line 2
 New railway bridge adjacent to Rajendra Setu on River Ganga in Begusarai,Bihar
 Samruddhi Mahamarg Package-14
 Pandho Takoli
 Samruddhi Mahamarg Package-02
 T49 Tunnel J&K
 Agaléga Military Base

References 

Indian engineering organisations
Shapoorji Pallonji Group